Andrew Michael Wisher (19 May 1935 – 21 July 1995) was an English actor. He made many appearances in Doctor Who, becoming best known for his performance in Genesis of the Daleks (1975) as the first actor to play Davros, the wheelchair-using scientific mastermind and creator of the Daleks.

Career

A regular actor in television drama from the 1960s onwards, he appeared in programmes such as Z-Cars, Dixon of Dock Green, Moonbase 3 and Colditz.  His theatre work was also extensive (and included a lengthy tour of New Zealand).

Doctor Who roles

Wisher is remembered for many different roles in the British science fiction television series Doctor Who. His contributions began with uncredited voice work in the Second Doctor serial The Seeds of Death (1969). The director of that story, Michael Ferguson, later asked Wisher to play reporter John Wakefield in the Third Doctor serial The Ambassadors of Death (1970). In the following season he appeared as Rex Farrel in Terror of the Autons (1971). During the later years of the Third Doctor era, Wisher acted as the villainous Commissioner Kalik in Carnival of Monsters (1973) and provided Dalek voices in Frontier in Space (1973), Planet of the Daleks (1973) and Death to the Daleks (1974).

Wisher continued to be associated with the series through the early Fourth Doctor years. In Genesis of the Daleks (1975), he was cast as Davros, the creator of the Daleks, who spoke with an electronically-aided voice, and also did one line of Dalek dialogue in the same story for Davros' test Dalek, saying "Aliens, I must exterminate". He voiced unseen characters in both Revenge of the Cybermen (1975) and Planet of Evil (1975), and acted on-screen in both serials (as Magrik in Revenge of the Cybermen, and Morelli in Planet of Evil).

Although Davros would be revived in further serials, Wisher's commitments to long-running theatre work, as well as the cancellation of the planned Season 20 finale Warhead (1983), prevented him from repeating his role on television when asked to appear. However, he did reprise the role in 1993 for The Trial of Davros, an amateur theatrical production staged for charity which he also co-wrote.

Doctor Who spin-offs 
In the period from 1984 to 1987 he created several characters in the Audio Visuals series, works that started the audio production careers of some of the figures currently associated with the licensed Big Finish Productions.

In 1987 the first video based spinoff, Wartime, was released by Reeltime Pictures, starring John Levene in his television role as Sergeant Benton. Wisher played the ghost of Benton's father.

He followed this by playing a villain with several faces in Summoned by Shadows, produced by BBV in 1991 and as a Minister in The Airzone Solution in 1993. That production included performances by four of the actors who had played the lead character in Doctor Who.  Finally, he played a spaceship engineer in Shakedown: Return of the Sontarans in 1994.

One of his final acting roles was as an evil looking theatre commissionaire in Dalekmania, a documentary about the production of the Dalek movies of the 1960s.

Death
Wisher died of a heart attack in 1995.

Filmography

References

External links

1935 births
1995 deaths
English male stage actors
English male television actors
Male actors from London
20th-century British male actors